Tropheus kasabae is a species of cichlid endemic to Lake Tanganyika where it is found in areas with rocky substrates in the southern portion of the lake. It can be found in the aquarium trade.

References

kasabae
Fish described in 1977
Taxonomy articles created by Polbot